Eslamabad (also Romanized as Eslāmābād) is a village in Choghamish Rural District, Choghamish District, Dezful County, Khuzestan Province, Iran. At the 2006 census, its population was 4,939, in 990 families.

References 

Populated places in Dezful County